The Buffalo Gap Wind Farm is located in Nolan and Taylor Counties, about  south west of Abilene, Texas. It was constructed in three phases and has a total wind generation capacity of 523.3 megawatts (MW).

Facility details

Buffalo Gap 1 consists of 67 Vestas V-80 wind turbines, each rated at 1.8 MW, for a total capacity of 120.6 MW. The wind farm was developed by SeaWest WindPower and is currently owned by AES Wind Generation. The power is sold to  Direct Energy Texas under a 15-year power purchase agreement.

Buffalo Gap 2 is a 232.5 MW expansion consisting of 155 GE SLE 1.5 MW wind turbines. The facility was developed by AES Wind Generation and went into commercial operation in June 2007. The power is sold to Direct Energy under a 10-year power purchase agreement.

Buffalo Gap 3 is a 170.2 MW addition, completed in September 2008, consisting of 74 Siemens 2.3 MW wind turbines.

Electricity production

See also
Wind power
List of onshore wind farms

References

Energy infrastructure completed in 2007
Energy infrastructure completed in 2008
Buildings and structures in Nolan County, Texas
Buildings and structures in Taylor County, Texas
Wind farms in Texas